There have been two baronetcies created for persons with the surname Marjoribanks, both in the Baronetage of the United Kingdom. Both creations are extinct.

The Marjoribanks Baronetcy, of Lees in the County of Berwick, was created in the Baronetage of the United Kingdom on 6 May 1815 for John Marjoribanks, Member of Parliament for Buteshire and Berwickshire and Lord Provost of Edinburgh. The title became extinct on the death of the fourth Baronet in 1888. The first Baronet's fourth son was David Robertson, 1st Baron Marjoribanks.

The Marjoribanks Baronetcy, of Guisachan, Beauly, in the County of Inverness, was created in the Baronetage of the United Kingdom on 25 July 1866. For more information on this creation, see Baron Tweedmouth.

Marjoribanks baronets, of Lees (1815)

Sir John Marjoribanks, 1st Baronet (1763–1833)
Sir William Marjoribanks, 2nd Baronet (1792–1834)
Sir John Marjoribanks, 3rd Baronet (1830–1884)
Sir William Marjoribanks, 4th Baronet (1832–1888)

Marjoribanks baronets, of Guisachan (1866)
see Baron Tweedmouth

References
 

Extinct baronetcies in the Baronetage of the United Kingdom